Sabal minor, commonly known as the dwarf palmetto, is a small species of palm. It is native to the deep southeastern and south-central United States and northeastern Mexico. It is naturally found in a diversity of habitats, including maritime forests, swamps, floodplains, and occasionally on drier sites. It is often found growing in calcareous marl soil. Sabal minor is one of the most frost and cold tolerant among North American palms.

Distribution
This palm's native range spans on the Atlantic Coast from central Florida north to Monkey Island, North Carolina. On the Gulf Coast, it spans from central Florida to central Texas, Arkansas, north to southern Oklahoma and northern Alabama, then south in the State of Nuevo León in Mexico.

Description
Sabal Minor grows up to 3 meters in height, with a trunk up to  diameter. It is a fan palm (Arecaceae tribe Corypheae), with the leaves with a bare petiole terminating in a rounded fan of numerous leaflets.

Cultivation
Sabal minor is one of the most cold hardy palms in cultivation; however, it does best when grown in hot and humid tropical summer conditions, and may struggle or grow slowly in cool summer climates. It is leaf hardy to near , and has been known to survive brief periods of  temperatures. It is generally cultivated in subtropical and warm temperate climates. S.minor can grow in a wide variety of soil types, and is often found submerged in swamps in the southeastern United States. It grows in both full sun and shaded locations, though it will do best in the cooler garden zones (below zone USDA 7) in full sun and a wind sheltered location. 

In the United States, since the 1960s, cultivation of Sabal minor has spread beyond the deep southern United States. S.minor is cultivated along the East Coast from Florida to coastal Connecticut, and on the West Coast from Vancouver BC south to San Diego. It is a recommended horticultural plant by the Virginia Cooperative Extension. There are several cultivars, including those from the Outer Banks of North Carolina (northernmost strains), and those from Oklahoma and Texas. One popular strain is 'McCurtain', named after McCurtain County, Oklahoma, where they are native. These tend to remain trunkless and smaller than those from warmer areas. S.minor is a popular landscape palm in coastal resort areas from Virginia Beach, Virginia, to southern Texas.

Gallery

References

External links
 Biota of North America Program 2014 county distribution map
 Interactive Distribution Map for Sabal minor

minor
Flora of the Southern United States
Plants described in 1776
Flora of Nuevo León